To Sleep Next To Her is a 2004 Italian drama film directed by Eugenio Cappuccio. It entered the Midnight section at the 61st Venice International Film Festival.

Cast 

 Giorgio Pasotti as Marco Pressi
 Cristiana Capotondi as Laura
  Elizabeth Olumoroti Fajuyigbe as Angélique
  Marcello Catalano as  Jean-Claude Rondeau
 Massimo Molea as  Giorgio Borghi
 Jun Ichikawa as  Fabienne Lo
  Giuseppe Gandini as  Alberto Spontini 
 Mariella Valentini as  Anna Mentosti
 Ninni Bruschetta as Syndicalist

See also  
 List of Italian films of 2004

References

External links

2004 films
Italian drama films
2004 drama films
2000s Italian-language films
2000s Italian films